Yorman Zapata Mina (born 1 September 2000) is a Colombian footballer who plays as a winger or attacker for Magallanes.

Career

In 2019, Zapata came to Chilean second tier side Magallanes from the Universidad Católica youth system, starting his professional career and helping them win the 2022 Copa Chile, their first major trophy, and earn promotion to the Chilean top flight.

References

External links
 

2000 births
Living people
Sportspeople from Nariño Department
Association football forwards
Association football wingers
Colombian footballers
Colombian expatriate footballers
Deportes Magallanes footballers
Magallanes footballers
Primera B de Chile players
Chilean Primera División players
Colombian expatriate sportspeople in Chile
Expatriate footballers in Chile